

ni

nia-nib
Niacor
nialamide (INN)
niaprazine (INN)
Niaspan
nibroxane (INN)

nic

nica-nicl
nicafenine (INN)
nicainoprol (INN)
nicametate (INN)
nicanartine (INN)
nicaraven (INN)
nicardipine (INN)
nicergoline (INN)
niceritrol (INN)
niceverine (INN)
Niclocide
niclofolan (INN)
niclosamide (INN)

nico

nicob-nicor
nicoboxil (INN)
nicoclonate (INN)
nicocodine (INN)
nicocortonide (INN)
Nicoderm (Johnson & Johnson)
nicodicodine (INN)
nicofibrate (INN)
nicofuranose (INN)
nicofurate (INN)
nicogrelate (INN)
Nicolar
nicomol (INN)
nicomorphine (INN)
nicopholine (INN)
nicorandil (INN)
Nicorette (Johnson & Johnson)

nicot-nicox
nicothiazone (INN)
nicotinamide (INN)
nicotine
nicotinic acid (INN)
nicotredole (INN)
Nicotrol
nicoxamat (INN)

nict
nictiazem (INN)
nictindole (INN)

nid
nidroxyzone (INN)

nif

nife-nifl
nifedipine (INN)
Nifehexal (Hexal Australia) [Au]. Redirects to nifedipine.
nifekalant (INN)
nifenalol (INN)
nifenazone (INN)
niflumic acid (INN)

nifu

nifun
nifungin (INN)

nifur

nifura-nifurs
nifuradene (INN)
nifuraldezone (INN)
nifuralide (INN)
nifuratel (INN)
nifuratrone (INN)
nifurdazil (INN)
nifurethazone (INN)
nifurfoline (INN)
nifurimide (INN)
nifurizone (INN)
nifurmazole (INN)
nifurmerone (INN)
nifuroquine (INN)
nifuroxazide (INN)
nifuroxime (INN)
nifurpipone (INN)
nifurpirinol (INN)
nifurprazine (INN)
nifurquinazol (INN)
nifursemizone (INN)
nifursol (INN)

nifurt-nifurz
nifurthiazole (INN)
nifurtimox (INN)
nifurtoinol (INN)
nifurvidine (INN)
nifurzide (INN)

nig-nio
niguldipine (INN)
nihydrazone (INN)
nikethamide (INN)
Nilandron (Sanofi-Aventis) redirects to nilutamide
nileprost (INN)
nilestriol (INN)
nilotinib (USAN)
nilprazole (INN)
Nilstat
niludipine (INN)
nilutamide (INN)
nilvadipine (INN)
nimazone (INN)
Nimbex
nimesulide (INN)
nimetazepam (INN)
nimidane (INN)
nimodipine (INN)
nimorazole (INN)
Nimotop
nimotuzumab (INN)
nimustine (INN)
niometacin (INN)

nip-nis
Nipent
Nipent (Parke-Davis Pharmaceutical Co.)
niperotidine (INN)
nipradilol (INN)
Nipride
niprofazone (INN)
niravoline (INN)
niridazole (INN)
nisbuterol (INN)
nisobamate (INN)
nisoldipine (INN)
nisoxetine (INN)
nisterime (INN)

nit

nita-niti
nitarsone (INN)
nitazoxanide (INN)
nitecapone (INN)
nitisinone (USAN)

nitr

nitra-nitri
nitracrine (INN)
nitrafudam (INN)
nitramisole (INN)
nitraquazone (INN)
nitrazepam (INN)
nitrefazole (INN)
nitrendipine (INN)
nitricholine perchlorate (INN)

nitro
Nitro IV
Nitro-Bid
Nitro-Dur
nitroclofene (INN)
nitrocycline (INN)
nitrodan (INN)
nitrofural (INN)
nitrofurantoin (INN)
Nitrol
Nitrolingual pumpspray
Nitrolingual
nitromifene (INN)
Nitronal
Nitropress
nitroscanate (INN)
Nitrostat
nitrosulfathiazole (INN)
nitroxinil (INN)
nitroxoline (INN)

niv-niz
nivacortol (INN)
nivimedone (INN)
Nix
nixylic acid (INN)
nizatidine (INN)
nizofenone (INN)
Nizoral